The 2022 French legislative election occurred on 12 June 2022 and 19 June 2022. In the Ain department, five deputies were elected with the department's five constituencies.

Results

Elected deputies

Department-wide results

Results by constituency 
The candidates are presented in descending order based upon the results of the first round. In the event of a victory in the second round by a candidate who did not come in first in the first round, their results are bolded.

First constituency 
Outgoing deputy: Xavier Breton (The Republicans).

Second constituency 
Outgoing deputy: Charles de La Verpillière (The Republicans).

Third constituency 
Outgoing deputy: Olga Givernet (La République en Marche!).

Fourth constituency 
Outgoing deputy: Stéphane Trompille (La République en Marche!).

Fifth constituency 
Outgoing deputy: Damien Abad (Independent/Miscellaneous right).

References 

2022 French legislative election
Elections in Ain